Valor Christian High School is a private, Christian high school in Highlands Ranch, Colorado, United States. The school colors are Navy blue, Columbia blue, and white, and the school nickname is The Eagles. Valor has four major focuses: Academics, Arts, Athletics, and Discovery (missionary outreach).

Academics 
Valor Christian has been named a Blue Ribbon school twice. The first time was in 2015 and the second in 2021. Valor Christian was the only Colorado high school named as a National Blue Ribbon School in 2021.

Valor Christian offers a variety of Advanced Placement (AP) courses as well as Dual Credit (DC) courses through certified local universities. As of the 2020–2021 school year Valor Christian offers 21 AP Courses and 14 DC courses.

Campus 
The Valor Christian campus is 35 acres, and consists of: an academic building with a library, labs, and 35 classrooms; the Valor Center for Culture & Influence, including a theatre, performance hall, and studios and classrooms for arts and media; and the athletics facilities, including the athletics building, a 5,200-seat artificial turf stadium, and athletics fields.

Athletics
The school is known for its sports program, especially football.They have been to the state championships multiple times.

State Championships

Notable Coaching Staff 
Valor has been known to have high-profile coaches. 2 time NCAA Champion Coach and Stanley Cup Finalist Assistant Coach George Gwozdecky has been the Ice hockey coach at Valor since 2015. For the 2018 and 2019 Football seasons Super Bowl Champion Ed McCaffrey was the head coach. Brent Vieselmeyer, now an NFL assistant coach, was head coach at Valor Christian. Four Time World Series Champion Mike Timlin continues to work as an assistant for the Valor baseball team.

Notable alumni 

Janine Beckie, soccer player, 2020 Olympic gold medalist
Tess Boade, soccer player
Wyndham Clark, PGA golfer
Jaelene Daniels, soccer player
Luke Del Rio, college football player
Christian Elliss, NFL Linebacker
Noah Elliss, NFL Defensive Tackle
Anna Hall, professional heptathlete for Adidas
Christian McCaffrey, Pro Bowl NFL running back for the San Francisco 49ers
Max McCaffrey, former NFL player, college football coach
Will Owen, American racing driver
Marybeth Sant-Price, Track and Field World Championship medalist

Allegations
In August 2021, the school was accused of forcing the resignations of two gay coaches based on their sexual orientation. Valor officials issued a statement stating that "they require staff, faculty and volunteer leaders to agree with Valor’s Christian beliefs set forth in the school’s statement of belief and to live in accordance with it."

References

See also

Christian schools in Colorado
Private high schools in Colorado
Schools in Douglas County, Colorado
Educational institutions established in 2007
Preparatory schools in Colorado
2007 establishments in Colorado